Chess with Friends  is a multiplayer asynchronous  chess game developed by Zynga with Friends (formerly Newtoy, Inc.), which also developed Words with Friends and Hanging with Friends. It was one of the first iPhone games to take an asynchronous approach to multiplayer. Released in November 2008 and published by Zynga, the game is available on iOS (iPad, iPhone, iPod Touch) and, since 2014, Android.

Paul Bettner, a Zynga with Friends founder, was quoted as saying, 

“So in August of 2008, we left Ensemble, bought some MacBooks and started working out of our local public library. A few months later, we put Chess with Friends on the App Store.”

Chess with Friends is a freemium game, meaning there is no cost to play, but players have the option of purchasing premium content.
Play a Friend (via link) - for players to quickly play someone from their friend list.

Default Time - options range from 1 to 14 days for each move. Game lies between 1 to 10-minute as per move default settings (for new users).

References

External links 
 Zynga with Friends
 Zynga

2008 video games
IOS games
Zynga
Android (operating system) games
Internet chess servers
Video games developed in the United States